Bucculatrix santolinella is a moth in the family Bucculatricidae. It was described by Thomas de Grey, 6th Baron Walsingham in 1898. It is found in southern France and Spain and on Corsica and Sardinia.

The wingspan is about 8 mm. The forewings are white with patches of olive-brown speckling with blackish scales. The hindwings are shining brownish-cinereous.

The larvae feed on Santolina species. They mine the leaves of their host plant. The larvae live freely at the underside of the leaves of their host plant, creating small fleck mines. Larvae can be found in May.

References

Natural History Museum Lepidoptera generic names catalog

Bucculatricidae
Moths described in 1898
Taxa named by Thomas de Grey, 6th Baron Walsingham
Moths of Europe